Léonce Deprez (10 July 1927 – 7 July 2017) was a French footballer and politician.  He competed in the men's tournament at the 1952 Summer Olympics. He was Mayor of Touquet-Paris-Plage from July 1969 to June 1995 and from March 2001 to March 2008.

References

External links
 

1927 births
2017 deaths
French footballers
Olympic footballers of France
Footballers at the 1952 Summer Olympics
People from Béthune
Association football goalkeepers
Sportspeople from Pas-de-Calais
Mayors of places in Hauts-de-France
Footballers from Hauts-de-France